The School of Mines in Reefton, New Zealand (1887–1970) was one of a number of mining schools set up to teach the science of mining during the 19th century gold rush. Like the Thames School of Mines it is a Heritage New Zealand Category 1 listed historic building.

History 
The Reefton Mining Institute was formed in March 1885. In the same year Professor James Gow Black from the University of Otago commenced lecturing there and an application was made to the government for a School of Mines building; land was granted in Shiel St. The building was opened in 1887.

The purpose of the school was to teach the science related to mining, both theory and practice. Subjects such as mathematics, surveying, chemistry and assaying were taught.

Directors of the School 

 Thomas Fenton, 1886–1890
 John Joseph Woodmass Lee, 1899–1902
 Thomas Otto Bishop, 1902–1903
 John Henderson, 1903–1911
 John Francis McPadden, 1911–1915
 John Herbert Williamson, 1915–1917
 Sydney Arthur Alexander Fry, 1917–1919
 John Francis McPadden, 1919–1920
 John Joseph Woodmass Lee, 1920–1927
 Lionel William Stevens, 1930–1938
 Leslie Clifton, 1938
 William James Bolitho, 1938–1970

Other Schools of Mines were set up in Coromandel, Waikato, West Coast, Nelson and Otago.

The school closed in 1970 when the then director Jim Bolitho retired. The building was then used by the St John's Ambulance from 1972 to 1989 when the Reefton School of Mines Historic Reserve was created.

Current status 
Since 1990 the building has been registered by Heritage New Zealand as a Category I structure, with registration number 263.

See also
 List of historic places in Buller District

References 

West Coast Gold Rush
Buildings and structures in the West Coast, New Zealand
1880s architecture in New Zealand
Heritage New Zealand Category 1 historic places in the West Coast, New Zealand
Gold mining in New Zealand
Educational institutions established in 1887
Educational institutions disestablished in 1970
Reefton
1887 establishments in New Zealand